Muhammed Emin Balcılar (born 15 April 1996) is a Turkish professional footballer who plays as a midfielder for TFF Third League club Amasyaspor FK. Balcılar made his debut for Çaykur Rizespor in a 1–1 tie with Galatasaray on 5 May 2015.

References

External links
 
 

1996 births
Sportspeople from Rize
Living people
Turkish footballers
Association football midfielders
Çaykur Rizespor footballers
Pazarspor footballers
Süper Lig players
TFF Second League players
TFF Third League players